The Aiguille du Chardonnet (3,824 m) is a mountain in the Mont Blanc massif in Haute-Savoie, France. The border with Switzerland (elevation: 3,680 m at its nearest point) runs just east of the summit. The East or Forbes Arete provides a popular and classic mountaineering route to the summit.

The summit was first climbed on 20 September 1865, by a party comprising R Fowler, M Balmat and M Ducroz. The first winter ascent was made some time prior to 1914.

Routes
West Ridge - traditionally regarded as the 'normal' and easiest route on the mountain, it is nowadays most commonly used as a means of descent. On the French adjectival climbing scale, is graded at AD-. First ascent P Thomas, J Imboden and J Lochmatter, 1 August 1879.
East Ridge (Forbes Arete) - a classic alpine mountaineering route described as "one of the finest expeditions of its class anywhere in the Alps", and is combined with a descent of the west ridge. First ascent by L, H and T Aubert and M Crettez on 30 July 1899. Grade AD.

There are many other mountaineering routes on the Chardonnet. On the northern side these include the North Buttress (D-); North Couloir (TD-); North West Couloir (TD-). On the south west face, Capucins Buttress Direct offers along and sustained climbing on rock at D+.

Access
The Aiguille du Chardonnet is most easily reached from the Albert Premier Hut, though the Trient Hut and Saleina Hut also give access.

References

External links
Aiguille du Chardonnet on Hikr
Aiguille du Chardonnet on Summitpost

Alpine three-thousanders
Mountains of Haute-Savoie
Mountains of the Alps
Mountains partially in Switzerland
Mont Blanc massif